Tribunal is an Australian television series which aired in 1963 to early 1964 on Sydney station ATN-7. Actors played controversial historical figures such as Brutus, General Custer, Lizzie Borden and Richard III, who were interrogated about their actions by Alastair Duncan. Among the actors who played roles were Gordon Glenwright, Ron Haddrick, James Condon, Kerry Francis, Denys Burrows Keith Buckley, and Nigel Lovell, The series aired in time-slots ranging from 10 minutes to 15 minutes

Despite airing in an era where Australian television series were often wiped, many of the episodes are held by the National Film and Sound Archive.

References

External links
Tribunal on IMDb
Tribunal at National Film and Sound Archive

1963 Australian television series debuts
1964 Australian television series endings
Black-and-white Australian television shows
English-language television shows